Robert Marchant O'Neil (October 16, 1934 – September 30, 2018) was an American lawyer and educator. A specialist in constitutional law, he served as president of the University of Virginia (1985-1990) and created the Thomas Jefferson Center for the Protection of Free Expression, whose director he became (1990-2010). During these years, O'Neil remained associated with the university's law school, where he taught courses in the First Amendment and the Arts, Speech and Press, Church and State, and Free Speech in Cyberspace.

Early and family life
O'Neil was born in Boston, Massachusetts on October 16, 1934. He attended Harvard University in nearby Cambridge, Massachusetts and earned an undergraduate baccalaureate degree in 1956. The following year, he received a master's degree (MA), and received a Bachelor in Law degree (LLB) from Harvard Law School in 1961. O’Neil later received honorary degrees from Beloit College and Indiana University (LLD, 1987).

He married Karen Elson, who would teach English and direct college counseling at St. Anne's-Belfield School in Charlottesville, Virginia. After 51 years of marriage, she survived him, as did three adult sons, an adult daughter and 13 grandchildren.

Teaching career
After graduating from law school, O'Neil served as a law clerk for Justice William J. Brennan of the Supreme Court of the United States during the 1962–1963 term. In 1963, he joined the law faculty of the University of California, Berkeley School of Law. While there, chaired the Academic Senate Committee on Academic Freedom.

From 1963 to 1967, O'Neil taught at Berkeley, then accepted a position as law professor at SUNY/Buffalo, where he also became executive assistant to  president Martin Myerson. After SUNY, O'Neil returned to Berkeley. He also at various times taught at the law schools of the University of Cincinnati College of Law, Indiana University at Bloomington, and the University of Wisconsin Law School. O'Neil became known for his defense of affirmative action and his study of the First Amendment promises.

Administrative career
In 1972, O'Neil began a career in academic administration after accepting a position of vice president and provost for academic affairs of the University of Cincinnati, rising to executive vice president of academic affairs the following year. In 1975 O'Neil became vice president for the Bloomington campus of Indiana University. In 1980 he became the president of the University of Wisconsin System.

In 1985, O'Neil became president of the University of Virginia, although he continued in other associations. For example, he served as general counsel of the Committee of the American Association of University Professors. He held this position for two years in the early 1970s and another two years in the early 1990s. He became president of this committee in 1999.
For almost two decades he was a trustee for the Carnegie Foundation for the Advancement of Teaching, the Educational Testing Service and the Johnson Foundation. He held the chairmanship of several organizations, including the National Association of State Universities, Land-Grant Colleges, and the boards of directors of the Virginia Coalition for Open Government. He was an executive member of the Association of American Universities and WVPT Public Television, the American Bar Association’s Human Rights Journal and the National Advisory Board of the American Civil Liberties Union.

O'Neil was the director of the Ford Foundation's Difficult Dialogues Initiative. He also participated on the Board of Consulting Editors of Trusteeship, journal of the Association of Governing Boards, journal of the Association of Governing Boards.

Publications
O’Neil has written numerous articles for law reviews and other journals and is the author of several books, including:

See also 
 List of law clerks of the Supreme Court of the United States (Seat 3)

References

External links
 Bio, University of Virginia Law School
 Bio, University of Virginia Law School Library
 Bio, University of Virginia presidents

1934 births
2018 deaths
Law clerks of the Supreme Court of the United States
Harvard Law School alumni
Indiana University faculty
UC Berkeley School of Law faculty
University of Cincinnati College of Law faculty
University at Albany, SUNY faculty
University of Wisconsin Law School faculty
University of Wisconsin–Madison faculty
Presidents of the University of Wisconsin System
University of Virginia faculty
Presidents of the University of Virginia
Lawyers from Boston
Writers from Boston
Writers from Indiana
Writers from New York (state)
Writers from Virginia
Writers from Wisconsin
University at Buffalo faculty
20th-century American lawyers
Harvard College alumni